Gabriel Markus (born 31 March 1970) is a former professional tennis player from Argentina.

Career
A clay court specialist, Markus was a quarter-finalist in the Boys' Singles event at the 1987 French Open and at his best was ranked second in the Argentine junior rankings.

The right-handed player made the fourth round of the US Open in 1991, the furthest he would reach in a Grand Slam. Along the way he defeated Diego Nargiso, Stefano Pescosolido and Jan Siemerink.

At the 1992 French Open he memorably pushed second seed Stefan Edberg to five sets in the second round, but was unable to register a win.

Markus won France's Phillips Open in 1992, his only title win on the ATP World Tour. He upset top seed Peter Sampras in the semi-finals.

He participated in two Davis Cup ties for the Argentine team. He defeated Denmark's Morten Christensen in their 1992 World Group encounter and beat both Uruguayan singles players when Argentina faced Uruguay in 1994.

Since retiring, Markus has been involved in coaching. He was coach of David Nalbandian when he reached the final of the 2002 Wimbledon Championships and was coaching Nicolás Massú at the 2004 Athens Olympics, where the Chilean won two gold medals. In 2010, he became coach of Richard Gasquet but they would part company before the year ended.

ATP career finals

Singles: 2 (1 title, 1 runner-up)

Doubles: 1 (1 title)

ATP Challenger and ITF Futures Finals

Singles: 12 (5–7)

Doubles: 4 (0–4)

Performance timeline

Singles

References

External links 
 
 

1970 births
Living people
Argentine male tennis players
Argentine tennis coaches
Tennis players from Buenos Aires